The Philippine House Committee on Economic Affairs, or House Economic Affairs Committee is a standing committee of the Philippine House of Representatives.

Jurisdiction 
As prescribed by House Rules, the committee's jurisdiction is on the economic development planning and programs which includes the following:
 Development policies and strategies
 Economic and socio-economic studies

Members, 18th Congress

Historical members

18th Congress

Chairperson 
 Sharon Garin (AAMBIS-OWA) July 22, 2019 – October 6, 2020

See also 
 House of Representatives of the Philippines
 List of Philippine House of Representatives committees
 National Economic and Development Authority

References

External links 
House of Representatives of the Philippines

Economic Affairs